Polygonum spergulariiforme is a North American species of flowering plants in the buckwheat family known by the common name spurry knotweed or fall knotweed. It grows in western Canada (British Columbia and Saskatchewan) and the western United States (primarily Washington, Oregon, and northern and central California but with a few isolated populations in Idaho, Wyoming and Montana).

Flowers are pink or white, in dense, elongated clumps. The plant flowers from June to October, later than some of its relatives.

References

External links

Oregon Flora Image Project, University of Hawai'i, Polygonum spergulariiforme

spergulariiforme
Flora of the Northwestern United States
Flora of British Columbia
Flora of California
Flora of the Cascade Range
Flora of the Klamath Mountains
Flora of the Sierra Nevada (United States)
Natural history of the California chaparral and woodlands
Plants described in 1856
Taxa named by Carl Meissner
Taxa named by John Kunkel Small
Flora without expected TNC conservation status